Heliothis albida is a moth of the family Noctuidae. It is found in North Africa, the Arabian Peninsula, the Levant (recorded only from Jordan and Israel) and the deserts of Iran.

Adults are on wing in April. There is one generation per year.

External links
 Heliothinae of Israel

Heliothis
Moths of the Middle East
Moths described in 1905